The Deputy Chief Minister of Kerala, an executive appointed by Governor, is a member of the Kerala Cabinet, part of the with the Kerala Council of Ministers, headed by the Chief Minister. The Deputy Chief Minister is the second highest ranking member of the Cabinet.

The office has since been occupied only thrice, having been occupied for a few years out of the 65 years since its inception.

 The first Deputy Chief Minister of Kerala was the Indian National Congress leader R. Sankar, who was also Minister for Finance in 1960 - 62 Pattom A. Thanu Pillai ministry (Joint Front). 
 The Second Deputy Chief Minister of Kerala was the Indian Union Muslim League leader C. H. Mohammed Koya, with Congress leader K. Karunakaran as the Chief Minister (U D F). 
 The third and last deputy chief minister was the Indian Union Muslim League leader K. Avukader Kutty Naha, who took on the role from 1983 to 1987 in Karunakaran's U D F government after demise of Koya.

List of  Deputy Chief Ministers of Kerala
Keys

See also
 Kerala Council of Ministers
 Chief Ministers of Kerala

References

Further reading
 

 
Kerala